Samuel Shaftoe (25 May 1841 – 27 November 1911) was a British trade unionist.

Born in York, Shaftoe moved with his family to Kingston upon Hull when he was eleven, leaving school and becoming an apprentice basket maker.  He joined the Basket Makers' trade union in 1862, and took part in a strike two years later, but lost his job as a result, and moved to Bradford to find work.  There, he played a prominent part in a six-month long strike, and was then elected as the local secretary of the Yorkshire Skep and Basket Makers' Union.

Shaftoe immediately began campaigning for the union to expand its remit and provide benefits for members who were unable to work due to illness, and for families of deceased members.  This was agreed, and in 1868 he was appointed as the union's general secretary.  He led two strikes, both successful, resulting in increases in wages and a maximum nine-hour day.

In 1872, Bradford Trades Council was refounded, and Shaftoe was elected as its first president.  He was seriously injured in 1875, and took two years out of union activism, but returned, then in 1882, instead became secretary of the trades council.  He also regularly attended the Trades Union Congress (TUC), and was elected as President of the TUC when it met in Bradford in 1888.  From 1891 until 1894, Shaftoe served on Bradford Town Council as a Liberal-Labour member, backed by the Bradford Labour Union.  During this time, he was also prominent in the Labour Electoral Association, and these roles brought him into conflict with the Bradford Labour Union, who wanted labour candidates to be entirely independent of the Liberal Party.  In 1893, he was defeated for his trades council post by a member of the new Independent Labour Party.  Despite bad feelings, Shaftoe remained involved with the labour movement in Bradford, and also became the first working man in the West Riding of Yorkshire to become a magistrate.

By 1905, Shaftoe was suffering poor health and struggling for an income.  The trades council persuaded the town council to pay him a small pension until his death in 1911.

References

1841 births
1911 deaths
Councillors in Bradford
Trade unionists from Kingston upon Hull
Liberal-Labour (UK) politicians
Presidents of the Trades Union Congress